Peace Review is a quarterly  peer-reviewed academic journal published by Routledge and covering peace and conflict studies. It was established in 1992 by John Harris (Stanford University), although the editorship was soon assumed by Robert Elias (University of San Francisco).

External links 

Peace and conflict studies
Political science journals
Publications established in 1992
Quarterly journals
Routledge academic journals